The following list is of spiders recorded in Sri Lanka, a tropical island situated close to the southern tip of India.

Spiders

Spiders (order Araneae) are air-breathing arthropods that have eight legs and chelicerae with fangs that inject venom. Anatomically, spiders differ from other arthropods in that the usual body segments are fused into two tagmata, the cephalothorax and abdomen, and joined by a small, cylindrical pedicel. Unlike insects, spiders do not have antennae. In all except the most primitive group, the Mesothelae, spiders have the most centralized nervous systems of all arthropods, as all their ganglia are fused into one mass in the cephalothorax. Unlike most arthropods, spiders have no extensor muscles in their limbs and instead extend them by hydraulic pressure.

, at least 45,700 spider species, and 114 families have been recorded by taxonomists. However, there has been dissension within the scientific community as to how all these families should be classified, as evidenced by the over 20 different classifications that have been proposed since 1900.

When considering the spider diversity in South Asia, which includes India, Pakistan, Bhutan, Bangladesh, Nepal, Maldives, and Sri Lanka, there are not much extensive spider taxonomy has revealed. Only in India, there is a precise catalogue of spiders are documented by arachnologists. All the other South Asian countries, the scientific study is much lesser than that of India. In Sri Lankan spider fauna, most of the articles and publications on spiders were done by Eugène Simon, C. L. Koch in the past and currently by Channa Bambaradeniya, K. B. Ranawana, V. A. M. P. K. Samarawickrama and Ranil P. Nanayakkara. However, most of them were interested on tiger spiders of Sri Lanka - genus Poecilotheria, not much work done in other spider categories. 

In 2012 IUCN National Red List of Sri Lanka, much more comprehensive study on spiders and other local fauna had taken place. Afterwards, two books named An introduction to common Spiders of Sri Lanka and Tiger Spiders - Poecilotheria of Sri Lanka by Ranil P. Nanayakkara were published in 2014 and 2013 respectively. Numerous publications and checklists have been made up since then and curiosity about the arachnid fauna arose in the country. Three new jumping spiders were identified in 2016. In 2018, nine new goblin spiders were identified from the country. With that, Sri Lankan goblin spider diversity increased to 45 described species in 13 different genera. In 2019, the genus Phintelloides was identified. Also, a checklist by Manju Siliwal and Sanjay Molur's detailed Checklist of Spiders of South Asia including 2006 revision of Indian spider checklist was published. This checklist provided all the described spider species of South Asia and part of South-East Asia as well. However, this checklist was published in 2007, making it rather outdated. In 2021, eight species of jumping spiders were identified. In 2020, two cellar spiders, and seven species of jumping spiders were described.

The following list provide the spiders currently identified in Sri Lanka. Due to being a very recent checklist, this list will be based on a checklist by Benjamin et al. (2012) among others, with the latest update being made in August 2020. This checklist was made by the Association for Conservation of Environment and Arthropods Sri Lanka, and encompasses a wide variety of referenced journals.

Currently, Sri Lanka has 589 species of spider, belonging to 50 families and 294 genera. Out of these 589 species, 318 are endemic spiders to Sri Lanka with 17 endemic genera.

Endemic species are denoted as E.

Family: Agelenidae 
- Funnel weavers

 Tegenaria domestica
Tegenaria parietina

Family: Anapidae 
- Ground orbweavers

 Taphiasssa punctigera - E

Family: Araneidae
- Orb weavers

 Acusilas coccineus
 Anepsion maritatum
 Arachnura scorpionoides
 Araneus minutalis
 Araneus mitificus
 Araneus obtusatus - E
 Argiope aemula
 Argiope aetherea
 Argiope anasuja
 Argiope catenulata
 Argiope pulchella
 Argiope taprobanica - E
 Caerostris indica
 Chorizopes frontalis
 Chorizopes mucronatus
 Clitaetra thisbe - E
 Cyclosa bifida
 Cyclosa insulana
 Cyclosa quinqueguttata
 Cyrtarachne perspicillata
 Cyrtarachne raniceps
 Cyrtophora cicatrosa
 Cyrtophora citricola
 Cyrtophora exanthematica
 Cyrtophora moluccensis
 Cyrtophora unicolor
 Eriovixia laglaizei
 Gasteracantha cancriformis
 Gasteracantha geminata
 Gasteracantha remifera
 Gea spinipes
 Gea subarmata
 Glyptogona duriuscula - E
 Herennia multipuncta 
 Hypsosinga taprobanica - E
 Macracantha arcuata
 Mangora semiargentea - E
 Neogea nocticolor
 Neoscona enucleata
 Neoscona nautica
 Neoscona punctigera
 Neoscona theisi
 Neoscona vigilans
 Nephila pilipes 
 Nephilengys malabarensis
 Ordgarius hobsoni
 Parawixia dehaani
 Poltys columnaris
 Poltys illepidus
 Thelacantha brevispina
 Ursa vittigera - E

Family: Barychelidae
- Brushe-footed trapdoor spiders

 Diplothele halyi - E
 Plagiobothrus semilunaris - E
 Sason robustum
 Sipalolasma ellioti - E
 Sipalolasma greeni - E

Family: Cheiracanthiidae
- Cheiracanth prowling spiders

 Cheiracanthium incertum - E
 Cheiracanthium indicum
 Cheiracanthium insigne
 Cheriacanthium melanostomum
 Cheiracanthium taprobanense - E

Family: Clubionidae
- Sac spiders

 Clubonia drassodes
 Matidia flagellifera - E
 Matidia simplex - E
 Nusatidia bimaculata - E
 Simalio lucorum - E
 Simalio phaeocephalus - E

Family: Corinnidae
- Ant-mimic and ground sac spiders

 Aetius decollatus
 Coenoptychus pulcher
 Copa annulata - E
 Copa spinosa - E
 Sphecotypus taprobanicus - E

Family: Ctenidae
- Wandering spiders

 Ctenus ceylonensis - E
 Ctenus kandyensis - E
 Ctenus karschi - E
 Ctenus thorelli - E
 Diallomus fuliginosus - E
 Diallomus speciosus - E

Family: Dictynidae
- Mesh web weavers

 Anaxibia nigricauda - E
 Atelolathys varia - E
 Dictyna turbida
 Dictynomorpha smaragdula - E
 Rhion pallidum - E

Family: Dipluridae
- Diplurid funnel-web spiders

 Indothele dumicola
 Indothele lanka - E

Family: Eresidae
- Velvet spiders

 Stegodyphus sarasinorum

Family: Hahniidae
- Dwarf sheet spiders

 Alistra radleyi - E
 Alistra stenura - E
 Alistra taprobanica - E
 Hahnia oreophila - E
 Hahnia pusio - E

Family: Hersiliidae
- Tree trunk spiders

 Hersilia pectinata
 Hersilia savignyi
 Hersilia sumatrana
 Hersilia tibialis
 Murricia crinifera - E
 Neotama variata - E
 Promurricia depressa - E

Family: Idiopidae
- Armored trapdoor spiders

 Heligmomerus taprobanicus - E
 Scalidognathus oreophilus - E
 Scalidognathus radialis - E

Family: Linyphiidae
- Sheet web and dwarf spiders

 Atypena ellioti - E
 Atypena simoni - E
 Ceratinopsis monticola - E
 Helsdingenia ceylonica - E
 Labullinyphia tersa - E
 Microbathyphantes palmarius 
 Nematogmus dentimanus
 Neriene katyae - E
 Nesioneta benoiti
 Obrimona tennenti - E
 Trematocephalus simplex - E
 Trematocephalus tripunctatus - E
 Typhistes antilope - E
 Typhistes comatus - E

Family: Liocranidae
- Liocranid sac spiders

 Argistes seriatus - E
 Argistes velox - E
 Koppe armata - E
 Oedignatha affinis - E
 Oedignatha bicolor - E
 Oedignatha coriacea - E
 Oedignatha flavipes - E
 Oedignatha gulosa - E
 Oedignatha major - E
 Oedignatha montigena - E
 Oedignatha proboscidea - E
 Oedignatha retusa - E
 Oedignatha scrobiculata
 Oedignatha striata - E
 Paratus reticulatus - E
 Sphingius scutatus - E

Family: Lycosidae
- Wolf spiders

 Draposa atropalpis
 Draposa lyrivulva
 Draposa subhadrae
 Hippasa greenalliae
 Hippasa olivacea
 Hogna lupina - E
 Lycosa indagatrix
 Lycosa nigrotibialis
 Lycosa yerburyi - E
 Ocyale lanca -  E
 Ocyale pilosa 
 Pardosa birmanica
 Pardosa palliclava - E
 Pardosa pseudoannulata
 Pardosa pusiola
 Pardosa semicana
 Pardosa sumatrana
 Pardosa timidula
 Wadicosa quadrifera
 Zoica parvula
 Zoica puellula

Family: Mimetidae
- Pirate spiders

 Mimetus sagittifer - E
 Mimetus strinatii - E
 Phobetinus sagittifer - E

Family: Mysmenidae
- Dwarf cobweb weavers

 Microdipoena saltuensis - E
 Phricotelus stelliger - E

Family: Nemesiidae 
- WIshbone spiders

 Atmetochilus fossor

Family: Nesticidae
- Scaffold web spiders

 Nesticella aelleni - E

Family: Ochyroceratidae
- Midget ground weavers

 Speocera taprobanica - E

Family: Oecobiidae 
- Flatmesh weavers

 Oecobius cellariorum

Family: Oonopidae
- Flatmesh weavers

 Aprusia kataragama - E
 Aprusia koslandensis - E
 Aprusia rawanaellensis
 Aprusia strenuus - E
 Aprusia vankhedei - E
 Aprusia veddah - E
 Aprusia vestigator - E
 Brignolia ambigua - E 
 Brignolia nigripalpis 
 Brignolia ondaatjei - E
 Brignolia parumpunctata
 Brignolia ratnapura - E 
 Brignolia shyami - E
 Brignolia sinharaja - E 
 Brignolia trichinalis 
 Camptoscaphiella simoni - E
 Cavisternum bom - E
 Gamasomorpha microps - E
 Gamasomorpha subclathrata - E 
 Gamasomorpha taprobanica - E
 Grymeus dharmapriyai - E
 Ischnothyreus bipartitus - E 
 Ischmothyreus chippy
 Ischnothyreus lymphaseus - E 
 Opopaea mollis - E
 Opopaea spinosiscorona 
 Orchestina dentifera - E 
 Orchestina manicata
 Orchestina pilifera - E
 Orchestina tubifera - E
 Pelicinus marmoratus
 Pelicinus snooky - E
 Pelicinus tumpy - E
 Silhouettella saaristoi - E
 Silhouettella snippy - E
 Silhouettella tiggy - E
 Xestaspis kandy - E
 Xestaspis nuwaraeliya - E
 Xestaspis padaviya - E
 Xestaspis paulina - E
 Xestaspis pophami - E
 Xestaspis sublaevis - E
 Xyphinus baehrae

Family: Oxyopidae
- Lynx spiders

 Oxyopes ceylonicus - E
 Oxyopes daksina 
 Oxyopes hindostanicus
 Oxyopes javanus 
 Oxyopes juvencus - E
 Oxyopes macilentus 
 Oxyopes nilgiricus - E 
 Oxyopes rufisternis - E
 Peucetia thalassina
 Peucetia viridana

Family: Palpimanidae
- Palp-footed spiders

 Steriphopus macleayi - E

Family: Philodromidae
- Running crab spiders

 Gephyrota virescens - E
 Tibellus vitilis

Family: Pholcidae
- Cellar spiders

 Artema atlanta
 Belisana badulla - E
 Belisana benjamini - E
 Belisana gowindahela
 Belisana keyti - E
 Belisana minneriya
 Belisana ratnapura - E
 Crossopriza lyoni
 Holocneminus multiguttatus 
 Leptopholcus kandy
 Leptopholcus podophthalmus
 Micropholcus fauroti
 Modisimus culicinus
 Pholcus ceylonicus
 Pholcus fragillimus
 Pholcus metta - E
 Pholcus opilionoides
 Pholcus puranappui - E
 Pholcus uva - E
 Physocyclus globosus
 Smeringopus pallidus
 Tissahamia ethagala - E
 Thissahamia karuna - E
 Thissahamia kottawagamaensis - E
 Uthinia luzonica
 Wanniyala agrabopath - E
 Wanniyala badulla - E
 Wanniyala batatota - E
 Wanniyala hakgala - E
 Wanniyala labugama - E
 Wanniyala mapalena - E
 Wanniyala mudita - E
 Wanniyala ohiya - E
 Wanniyala orientalis - E
 Wanniyala upekkha - E
 Wanniyala viharakele - E

Family: Pisauridae
- Nursery web spiders

 Dolomedes boiei 
 Dolomedes karschi - E
 Nilus albocinctus
 Perenethis sindica
 Perenethis venusta
 Pisaura consocia

Family: Psechridae
- Pseudo-orbweavers & Horizontal lace web weavers

 Fecenia macilenta
 Fecenia protensa
 Psechrus torvus

Family: Salticidae
- Jumping spiders

 Aelurillus kronestedti 
 Aelurillus quadrimaculatus 
 Asemonea tenuipes
 Ballus segmentatus - E 
 Ballus sellatus - E 
 Bavirecta exilis - E
 Bavirecta flavopunctata - E
 Bianor angulosus'
 Brancus calebi Brettus adonis - E
 Bristowia gandhii Carrhotus taprobanicus - E 
 Carrhotus viduus Chrysilla lauta Chrysilla volupe Colaxes horton - E 
 Colaxes wanlessi - E 
 Cosmophasis olorina - E 
 Curubis annulata - E 
 Curubis erratica Curubis tetrica Epidelaxia albocruciata - E 
 Epidelaxia albostellata - E 
 Epidelaxia obscura - E 
 Epocilla aurantiaca Euophrys declivis Euryattus bleekeri Euryattus breviusculus - E
 Evarcha cancellata Evarcha flavocincta Flacillula dothalugala - E 
 Flacillula ellaensis - E 
 Flacillula henryi - E
 Flacillula hodgsoni - E
 Flacillula johnstoni - E
 Flacillula lubrica - E
 Flacillula naipauli - E
 Flacillula piyasenai - E
 Gelotia lanka - E
 Habrocestum hantaneensis - E
 Habrocestum kodigalaensis - E
 Habrocestum ohiensis - E
 Habrocestum liptoni - E
 Harmochirus brachiatus Hasarius arcigerus - E
 Hasarius adansoni Hyllus semicupreus Icius disicatus - E
 Irura pulchra - E
 Jerzego bipartitus Macaroeris nidicolens Maevia roseolimbata - E
 Marengo crassipes Marengo inornata - E
 Marengo nitida - E
 Marengo rattotensis - E
 Marengo striatipes - E 
 Menemerus bivittatus Menemerus fulvus Modunda aeneiceps Mogrus frontosus Myrmage dishani - E
 Myrmage imbellis - E
 Myrmaplata plataleoides Myrmarachne bicurvata - E
 Myrmarachne melanocephala Myrmarachne morningside - E
 Myrmarachne prava Myrmarachne ramunni Myrmarachne spissa - E
 Myrmarachne uniseriata Myrmarachne tristis Onomastus corbetensis - E
 Onomastus jamestaylori - E
 Onomastus maskeliya - E
 Onomastus nigricaudus - E
 Onomastus pethiyagodai - E
 Onomastus quinquenotatus - E
 Onomastus rattotensis - E
 Padillothorax taprobanicus - E
 Panachraesta paludosa - E
 Panysinus semiermis - E
 Phaeacius wanlessi 
 Phausina bivittata - E
 Phausina flavofrenata - E
 Phausina guttipes - E
 Phintella argentea - E
 Phintella vittata Phintella bifurcilinia Phintella jaleeli - E
 Phintelloides alborea - E
 Phintelloides brunne - E
 Phintelloides flavoviri - E
 Phintelloides flavumi - E
 Phintelloides jesudasi Phintelloides orbisa - E
 Phintelloides multimaculata - E
 Phyaces comosus - E
 Plexippus paykulli Plexippus petersi Plexippus redimitus Portia albimana Portia fimbriata 
 Portia labiata 
 Proszynskia diatreta Ptocasius fulvonitens - E 
 Rhene albigera Rhene flavicomans Rhene tamula - E
 Saitis chaperi 
 Saitis kandyensis - E 
 Schenkelia aurantia - E
 Sigytes paradisiacus - E 
 Siler semiglaucus Simaetha cingulata - E 
 Simaetha laminata - E 
 Simaetha reducta - E 
 Spartaeus spinimanus Stenaelurillus ilesai - E
 Stergusa aurata - E 
 Stergusa aurichalcea - E 
 Stergusa stelligera - E 
 Synagelides hortonensis - E
 Synagelides lakmalii - E
 Synagelides orlandoi - E
 Synagelides rosalindae - E
 Tamigalesus fabus - E
 Tamigalesus munnaricus - E
 Telamonia dimidiata Telamonia sponsa - E 
 Thiania bhamoensis Thiania pulcherrima Thyene coccinea Thyene imperialis Toxeus maxillosus Uroballus henicurus - E 
 Uroballus octovittatus - E 
 Viciria polysticta - E

Family: Scytodidae
- Spitting spiders

 Scytodes fusca Scytodes lugubris Scytodes venustaFamily: Segestriidae
- Tubeweb spiders

 Ariadna oreades - E
 Ariadna taprobanica - E

 Family: Selenopidae 
- Wall crab spiders

 Selenops radiatus Family: Sicariidae 
- Six-eyed brown spiders

 Loxosceles rufescensFamily: Sparassidae
- Huntsman spiders

 Heteropoda eluta - E
 Heteropoda kandiana - E
 Heteropoda umbrata - E
 Heteropoda venatoria Olios ceylonicus - E
 Olios greeni - E
 Olios hirtus - E
 Olios lamarcki Olios milleti Olios punctipes 
 Olios senilis 
 Pandercetes decipiens 
 Pandercetes plumipes 
 Rhitymna occidentalis - E 
 Spariolenus taprobanicus - E 
 Stasina nalandica - E 
 Stasina paripes - E 
 Thelcticopis hercules - E

Family: Stenochilidae
-  Stecnochilid assassin spiders

 Stenochilus crocatusFamily: Tetrablemmidae
- Armored spiders

 Brignoliella ratnapura - E
 Brignoliella scrobiculata - E
 Gunasekara ramboda - E
 Pahanga diyaluma - E
 Shearella lilawati - E
 Shearella selvarani - E
 Tetrablemma medioculatum - E

Family: Tetragnathidae
- Long-jawed orb weavers

 Atelidea spinosa - E
 Dolichognatha albida 
 Dolichognatha incanescens 
 Dolichognatha nietneri - E
 Dolichognatha quinquemucronata - E
 Glenognatha dentata 
 Guizygiella melanocrania 
 Leucauge celesbania 
 Leucauge decorata 
 Leucauge ditissima 
 Leucauge granulata 
 Leucauge lamperti - E
 Leucauge undulata 
 Mesida culta Opadometa fastigata 
 Schenkeliella spinosa - E
 Tetragnatha armata - E
 Tetragnatha determinata - E
 Tetragnatha foveata Tetragnatha geniculata Tetragnatha gracilis 
 Tetragnatha mandibulata Tetragnatha maxillosa Tetragnatha planata - E
 Tetragnatha tenera 
 Tetragnatha virescens 
 Tetragnatha viridorufa 
 Tylorida striata 
 Tylorida ventralis 

Family: Theraphosidae

- Tarantulas

 Chilobrachys nitelinus - E
 Plesiophrictus tenuipes - E
 Poecilotheria fasciata - E
 Poecilotheria hanumavilasumica Poecilotheria ornata - E
 Poecilotheria rajaei - E
 Poecilotheria smithi - E
 Poecilotheria subfusca - E
 Poecilotheria vittata - E

Family: Theridiidae
- Cobweb spiders

 Argyrodes argentatus 
 Argyrodes fissifrons 
 Argyrodes flavescens 
 Argyrodes nasutus - E 
 Argyrodes scintillulanus 
 Ariamnes pavesii 
 Cephalobares globiceps Chikunia nigra 
 Coleosoma blandum 
 Chrysso spiniventris 
 Coscinida gentilis - E
 Coscinida novemnotata - E
 Coscinida triangulifera Dipoena sertata - E
 Emertonella taczanowskii Enoplognatha oreophila - E
 Euryopis brevis 
 Euryopis episinoides 
 Janula taprobanica - E
 Kochiura aulica Latrodectus erythromelas 
 Latrodectus hasselti 
 Meotipa spiniventris 
 Molione trispinosa - E
 Moneta spinigera 
 Nesticodes rufipes 
 Nihonhimea mundula 
 Parasteatoda tepidariorum 
 Phoroncidia nasuta - E
 Phoroncidia septemaculeata Phoroncidia testudo Phoroncidia thwaitesi - E
 Phycosoma spundana 
 Platnickina mneon 
 Propostira quadrangulata - E
 Steatoda rufoannulata Theridion albomaculosum - E
 Theridion ceylonicus - E
 Theridion gabardi - E
 Theridion modestum - E
 Theridion nilgherinum 
 Theridion nodiferum - E
 Theridion quadratum 
 Theridion teliferum - E
 Theridula gonygaster 
 Theridula opulenta 
 Thwaitesia margaritiferaFamily: Theridiosomatidae
- Ray spiders

 Andasta semiargentea - E 
 Ogulnius pullus 
 Theridiosoma genevensium - E

Family: Thomisidae
- Crab spiders

 Amyciaea forticeps Boliscus decipiens - E 
 Borboropactus asper - E 
 Camaricus formosus 
 Cebrenninus striatipes 
 Cymbacha simplex - E 
 Diaea placata - E
 Epidius longipalpis Epidius parvati - E
 Holopelus piger - E
 Indoxysticus minutus 
 Lysiteles catulus 
 Monaeses attenuatus - E
 Monaeses cinerascens Monaeses greeni - E
 Oxytate subvirens - E
 Oxytate taprobane - E
 Pagida salticiformis - E
 Phrynarachne ceylonica Phrynarachne decipiens 
 Phrynarachne fatalis - E
 Phrynarachne rothschildi - E 
 Platythomisus sudeepi Runcinia bifrons 
 Stiphropus sigillatus - E 
 Tagulis mystacinus - E 
 Talaus oblitus - E 
 Tarrocanus capra - E 
 Tarrocanus jaffnaensis - E
 Thomisus callidus 
 Thomisus elongatus 
 Thomisus granulifrons Thomisus pugilis Thomisus spectabilis Thomisus stoliczkai 
 Tmarus fasciolatus Tmarus taiwanus 
 Tmarus hystrix - E
 Tmarus hiyarensis - E
 Tmarus viridomaculatus - E
 Tmarus manojkaushalyai 

Family: Titanoecidae
- Rock weavers

 Pandava laminataFamily: Trachelidae
- Trachelid ground spiders

 Orthobula impressa 
 Trachelas oreophilus Trachelas quisquiliarum - E
 Utivarachna accentuata - E

Family: Udubidae
- Udubid spiders

Family: Uloboridae
- Cribellate orb weavers

 Hyptiotes analis - E 
 Miagrammopes ferdinandi - E 
 Miagrammopes thwaitesi Uloborus bigibbosus Uloborus umboniger - E
 Zosis geniculata 

Family: Zodariidae
- Ant spider

 Cryptothele ceylonica - E
 Habronestes bradleyi 
 Hermippus cruciatus 
 Suffasia attidiya - E 
 Suffasia mahasumana - E

Family: Zoropsidae
- False wolf spiders

 Devendra amaiti - E
 Devendra pardalis - E 
 Devendra pumilus - E 
 Devendra saama - E
 Devendra seriatus'' - E

References

 
Sri Lanka
Spiders
.Sri Lanka